Khairlanji is a village in Mohadi Taluka of Bhandara district of Maharashtra, India. The village comes in limelight due to Khairlanji massacre of 2006 lynching-style murders of a Dalit family by members of the Kunbi, a backward caste in India.

Villages in Bhandara district